Mark Andrew Wallis (born 1964) is an English greyhound trainer. He is a record 13 times UK champion Greyhound Trainer of the Year.

Profile
In 1990, Wallis joined leading trainer Linda Jones at the Imperial Kennels (Linda would later become his mother-in-law). The kennel gained significant success during the following 15 years.

In 2005 he became a trainer in his own right taking over the Imperial Kennels from Linda Jones. Patrick Janssens was a kennelhand for Wallis from 2005-2014. Wallis secured the trainers title in his first year of training and won his first major competition (the Grand National). The kennel continued to gain success and won numerous events culminating in the 2009 English Greyhound Derby crown. A second Derby triumph ensued when he won the 2012 English Greyhound Derby with Blonde Snapper. 

He currently runs out of Henlow Stadium which he joined in August 2018,  from his Lakenheath Kennels. Previously he was attached to Walthamstow Stadium until it closed and then Harlow Stadium until July 2010 when he left for Yarmouth Stadium, in order for his greyhounds being schooled behind a Swaffham hare. He then joined Towcester Greyhound Stadium when it opened in 2014 and stayed there until it closed during 2018.

Major wins in 2019 included the TV Trophy, Regency, Champion Stakes and Kent St Leger and the following year in 2020 he won the Cesarewitch (held for the first time in eight years). By the end of 2020 his eight year reign as trainer of the year came to an end at the hands of his former pupil Patrick Janssens. However during the year he still secured the prestigious Cesarewitch and a second successive TV Trophy, both won by Aayamza Royale. Aayamza Royale (a black bitch) was then voted the 2020 Greyhound of the Year.

In January 2021, he won the Essex Vase for a record fifth time and in May, Aayamza Royal became the fourth greyhound to win the TV Trophy twice, setting a record of fours wins for Wallis in the process. Wallis duly secured a 12th and 13th Greyhound Trainer of the Year title at the end of 2021 & 2022 respectively.

Awards
He has won the Greyhound Trainer of the Year a record 13 times (2005, 2008, 2009, 2012, 2013, 2014, 2015, 2016, 2017, 2018, 2019, 2021, 2022) and the Trainers Championship four times in 2006, 2010, 2018 and 2022.

References 

1964 births
Living people
British greyhound racing trainers